State Route 143 (SR 143) is a north–south state highway in the southern portion of the U.S. state of Ohio. It is also home to the famous 143 yard sale, a 20 mile long annual event where anyone on the route is open to host a yard sale.

Route description

Along its way, SR 143 passes through the western half of Meigs County and ducks into the extreme southwestern portion of Athens County. There is no portion of this state highway that is included within the National Highway System, a network of routes deemed most important for the country's economy, mobility and defense.

History
The designation of SR 143 took place in 1923.  Originally, this highway started in downtown Middleport at the intersection of 2nd Avenue, the former routing of SR 7, and Mill Street.  It followed Mill Street to the northwest, which becomes known as Bradbury Road once it leaves the village. SR 143 continued on Bradbury Road to its intersection with SR 124, then turned east onto the current alignment of SR 124.  It proceeded east to the SR 7 intersection, then turned north onto what is presently SR 7 and SR 124 to the current southern terminus of SR 143.  It then followed the entirety of its current alignment, coming to an end at the predecessor to US 50, SR 26.

By 1969, in conjunction with the completion of a new SR 7 bypass of Middleport and Pomeroy, the SR 143 designation was removed from the portions located to the south of its current southern terminus, thus resulting in the highway taking on the shape it has today.  Jurisdiction of the portion of SR 143 along Mill Street in Middleport was turned over to the county, while control of the Bradbury Road section was transferred to Meigs County.  The east–west concurrent segment with SR 124 became just SR 124, while the north–south concurrent stretch with SR 124 turned into a concurrency of SR 7 and SR 124.

Major intersections

See also

References

External links

143
Transportation in Meigs County, Ohio
Transportation in Athens County, Ohio